The Piper's miner bee (Andrena piperi) is a species of miner bee in the family Andrenidae. It is found in Central America and North America.

References

Further reading

 
 

piperi
Articles created by Qbugbot
Insects described in 1904